Trevor Korn (born 24 January 1959) is a former Australian rules footballer who played with Melbourne in the Victorian Football League (VFL).

Notes

External links 		
		
		
		
		
		
		
1959 births
Living people
Australian rules footballers from Victoria (Australia)		
Melbourne Football Club players